Put or PUT may refer to:

Finance
 Put option, a financial contract between a buyer and a seller
 CBOE S&P 500 PutWrite Index (ticker symbol)

Science and technology
 Programmable unijunction transistor

Computing
 Parameterized unit testing, in computer programming
 Put, a Hypertext Transfer Protocol request method
 Put, a File Transfer Protocol option to copy a file to a remote system; see List of FTP commands
 Put, an output procedure in Pascal, Turing, and other programming languages
 In C, simple functions, puts and puts(), that put text on the screen

Education
 Petroleum University of Technology, Abadan, Ahvaz, Mahmud Abad and Tehran, Iran
 Poznań University of Technology, Poland (Polish name: Politechnika Poznańska)

Transportation
 Pui To stop (MTR station code), Hong Kong
 Putney railway station (National Rail station code), London
 Sri Sathya Sai Airport (IATA code), Puttaparthi, Andhra Pradesh, India

Other uses
 Phut or Put, Biblical grandson of Noah
 Put (band), from Rijeka, Croatia
 Put (card game), a 16th-century card game

See also
 Putt (disambiguation)
 Putte (disambiguation)

ca:Llista de personatges bíblics#Put